Peter Biziou BSC (born 8 August 1944 in Wales) is a British cinematographer.

Peter Biziou is the son of special effects cameraman and cinematographer Leon Bijou best known for shooting Foxes in 1980. He began his career in the mid-1960s where he worked on short films by Norman J. Warren and Robert Freeman. In 1973 he began his collaboration with director Alan Parker. They shot the two shorts Footsteps and Our Cissy in 1974 and in 1976 Biziou got the opportunity to work on Parker's feature film Bugsy Malone. Biziou's next works include Monty Python's Life of Brian, Time Bandits and Pink Floyd - The Wall.

Biziou won the Academy Award and the BAFTA Award for Alan Parker's film Mississippi Burning. He received a further BAFTA nomination for Peter Weir's film The Truman Show.

Filmography

Short films

References

External links

Internet encyclopedia of Cinematographers

1944 births
Living people
Best Cinematographer Academy Award winners
Best Cinematography BAFTA Award winners
Welsh cinematographers